Fools Rush In is a 1949 British comedy film directed by John Paddy Carstairs and starring Sally Ann Howes, Guy Rolfe and Nigel Buchanan.

Plot
Pamela Dickson (Sally Ann Howes) is about to marry  her fiancé Joe Trent (Nigel Buchanan), when her long-lost father (Guy Rolfe) arrives. Ostensibly a cad, he turns out to be just the opposite, so she immediately puts her own plans on hold to arrange a reconciliation between her father and mother (Nora Swinburne) before marrying her beloved Joe.

Cast
 Sally Ann Howes - Pamela Dickson
 Guy Rolfe - Paul Dickson
 Nigel Buchanan - Joe Trent
 Nora Swinburne - Angela Dickson
 Esma Cannon - Mrs Atkins	
 Raymond Lovell - Sir Charles Leigh
 Thora Hird - Mrs. Coot
 Peter Hammond - Tommy
 Patricia Raine - Millicent
 Charles Victor - Mr. Atkins
 Nora Nicholson - Mrs. Mandrake
 Guy Verney - Clergyman
 Jonathan Field - Organist
 David Liney - Flower Boy	
 George Mansfield - Car Driver

Critical reception
TV Guide called it "A redundant film which only fools would rush in to see"; while Allmovie noted, "Fools Rush In is as light as a feather, but it pleases the crowd."

References

External links

1949 films
Films directed by John Paddy Carstairs
1949 comedy films
British comedy films
Films shot at Pinewood Studios
British black-and-white films
1940s English-language films
1940s British films